Mitteldeutscher Basketball Club, for sponsorship reasons named SYNTAINICS MBC, and commonly known as MBC, is a professional basketball club based in Weißenfels, Germany. The club currently plays in the Basketball Bundesliga, the first tier league in Germany.

History

The club has played in the Basketball Bundesliga since the 1999–2000 season. In 2004, the club won the FIBA EuroCup Challenge, defeating JDA Dijon Basket in the Final. Later that season, however, the team filed for bankruptcy and the league relegated the team to the Regionalliga (third division).

MBC won promotion to the second division after the 2004–05 season and earned promotion back to the Basketball Bundesliga after the 2008–09 season. In 2010 and 2016 the team relegated again, but promoted back the next season both times.

Honours
ProA:
Champions: 2008–09, 2011–12, 2016–17
FIBA Europe Cup:
Champions: 2003–04

Team

Current roster

Individual awards
ProA MVP
Wayne Bernard: 2008
Arizona Reid: 2012

Notable players

 Mithat Demirel
 Misan Nikagbatse
 Manuchar Markoishvili
 Giorgi Gamqrelidze
 Martynas Andriuškevičius
 Marijonas Petravičius
 Mindaugas Timinskas
 Wendell Alexis

Season by season

References

External links

Weißenfels
Basketball teams in Saxony-Anhalt
Basketball teams established in 1958
1958 establishments in Germany